Autoroute A34 is a toll free motorway in northeastern France, approximately  long. It is an upgrade of the N43 and N51. It links Sedan with Reims. It forms part of European routes E44 and E46.

Junctions

Numbered A203

Numbered A34

External links

A34 autoroute in Saratlas

A34